Vansinnesvisor is the name of the fourth album by the Viking metal band Thyrfing. It was released in 2002. The lyrics to track number six, "The Giant's Laughter", are a translation of the poem "Jätten" written by the Swedish poet Esaias Tegnér.

Track listing
 "Draugs Harg (Draugr's Altar)" - 4:01
 "Digerdöden (The Black Death)" - 4:48
 "Världsspegeln (The Mirror of the World)" - 4:52
 "The Voyager" - 5:12
 "Ångestens Högborg (The Stronghold of Anxiety)" - 7:03 
 "The Giant's Laughter" - 5:19
 "Vansinnesvisan (The Song of Madness)" - 4:43 
 "Kaos Återkomst (The Return of Chaos)" - 6:59

References

2002 albums
Thyrfing albums